The 2008–09 Big East Conference men's basketball season was the 30th in conference history, and involved its 16 full-time member schools. Leading up to, during, and following the season, it has been widely regarded as one of the most successful seasons in Big East Conference history, fielding multiple teams that received national recognition and achieved high levels of success.

Louisville won the outright championship with a 16-2 record (1st).  They were also champions of the Big East tournament (1st).

Regular season

Season summary & highlights
 Louisville won both the regular season outright and the tournament championship.
 Louisville finished the season ranked first in both AP and Coach's polls.
 Louisville received the overall #1 seed in the NCAA tournament.
 Connecticut won the 2008 Paradise Jam Tournament in the Virgin Islands.
 Pittsburgh won the 2008 Legends Classic Tournament.
 Syracuse won the 2008 College Basketball Experience (CBE) Classic tournament.
 Connecticut led the nation in blocked shots for the 8th consecutive year.
 Connecticut Head Coach, Jim Calhoun, won his 800th career game in Division I basketball, against Marquette.
 Syracuse Head Coach, Jim Boeheim, finished the season with 799 career wins (2009 tournament games included).
 Pittsburgh defeated #1 UConn twice, marking the first and second times the Panthers defeated a #1 ranked team.
 Connecticut center, Hasheem Thabeet, recorded a triple-double against Providence on January 31, 2009, with 15 points, 11 rebounds, and 10 blocked shots.
 Villanova tied a school record for regular season wins (25).
 Pittsburgh tied a school record for wins in a season (31), and set a school record for regular season conference wins (15).
 Connecticut tied a school record for best start to a season, at 24–1.
 Pittsburgh went undefeated at home.
 Connecticut, Pittsburgh, and Louisville all reached #1 in the AP poll.

Rankings
The Big East set a record when it placed seven teams in the preseason Associated Press poll.  It set another record by placing eight teams in the December 1st ranking, and broke that record when the ninth team entered the AP Top 25 on January 5. Connecticut and North Carolina were the only two teams that did not vacate the top 5 in the AP poll all season.

Statistical leaders

Postseason

Big East tournament

For the first time ever, all 16 teams in the conference would have the chance to participate in the Big East tournament. Under this new format, the teams finishing 9 through 16 in the regular season standings played first round games, while teams 5 through 8 received a bye to the second round. The top 4 teams during the regular season received a bye to the quarterfinals. The five-round tournament spanned five consecutive days, from Tuesday, March 10, 2009, through Saturday, March 14, 2009. A low-seeded team could have theoretically played all five days if it won its games in the first four rounds, but this did not turn out to be the case.

1–4 Seeding:
(1) Louisville, (2) Pittsburgh, (3) Connecticut, (4) Villanova
5–8 Seeding:
(5) Marquette, (6) Syracuse, (7) West Virginia, (8) Providence
9–16 Seeding and First Round Matchups:
(16) DePaul def. (9) Cincinnati
(10) Notre Dame def. (15) Rutgers
(11) Seton Hall def. (14) South Florida
(13) St. John's def. (12) Georgetown

Second Round Matchups:
(5) Marquette def. (13) St. John's
(6) Syracuse def. (11) Seton Hall
(7) West Virginia def. (10) Notre Dame
(8) Providence def. (16) DePaul

Quarterfinals Matchups:
(1) Louisville def. (8) Providence
(7) West Virginia def. (2) Pittsburgh
(6) Syracuse def. (3) Connecticut (6 OT)
(4) Villanova def. (5) Marquette

Semifinals Matchups:
(1) Louisville def. (4) Villanova
(6) Syracuse def. (7) West Virginia (OT)

Championship Game:
(1) Louisville def. (6) Syracuse, 76–66

The most notable game of the tournament was the third round matchup between Connecticut and Syracuse. A back-and-forth thriller between two rivals, this game lasted nearly four hours and finally ended after six overtimes, at 1:22 a.m. the following day. The game was tied at 71–71 with a second left in regulation, when Syracuse inbounded a pass the full length of the court. Guard, Eric Devendorf, sunk a 3-point shot as the clock appeared to run out, seemingly giving Syracuse the game. After a thorough review by officials using frame-by-frame slow motion, it became apparent that the ball was not completely off of Devendorf's fingertips as the clock changed from 0.1 to 0.0 seconds. The game headed to overtime. During overtime, UConn took a lead and maintained it, until Syracuse finally tied the score to force another overtime. This pattern continued for five overtimes, where in each one, UConn took and maintained a lead, only to have Syracuse tie the score before time ran out. In the sixth and final overtime, Syracuse came out and took a large lead (their first since regulation) that eventually proved insurmountable for UConn, and won the game, 127–117. The game produced a few records when it came to duration, including longest Big East game in history. A.J. Price of Connecticut, and Jonny Flynn and Eric Devendorf of Syracuse, each played over 60 minutes, with another three Connecticut players and one Syracuse player playing over 50 minutes. Between the two teams, nine players had double-figure point totals, and five UConn players had double-figure rebound totals. With over 100 points scored in the overtime periods alone, this game was dubbed an "Instant Classic" and was given the title "The Game That Wouldn't End."

In the following round, Syracuse again found itself in overtime, this time against West Virginia. Syracuse came out the winner, but would lose the following night to Louisville. This was Louisville's first Big East tournament championship. Jonny Flynn was named the tournament's Most Outstanding Player, becoming only the 4th player in the 30 year history of the tournament to win the award while playing on the losing team.

NCAA tournament

The Big East posted a very strong showing in the NCAA tournament. Though Notre Dame, Georgetown, and Providence were unable to secure at-large bids, seven conference teams were undisputedly deserving and were selected. The Big Ten and the Atlantic Coast Conference also sent seven teams each, which was one short of the record of eight that the Big East sent in 2006 and 2008. The conference set a record by earning three #1 seeds among the four available. Connecticut, Louisville, and Pittsburgh were all the top seeds in their regions, with North Carolina being the fourth. The conference set another record by having five teams make it to the Sweet-16, and then an additional record by having four teams make it to the Elite Eight. Connecticut and Villanova each advanced to the Final Four. This was Villanova's fourth Final Four appearance (though one was vacated for violations) and first since 1985. This was UConn's third Final Four appearance, with all coming since 1999, and all happening to come from the West region. The conference finished with a combined record of 17–7.

National Invitation Tournament

In the 72nd annual National Invitation Tournament, there were three Big East teams among the field of 32: Georgetown, Notre Dame, and Providence.
 Notre Dame received a 2-seed in its region. They won their first round game against 7-seed UAB, 70–64. They beat 3-seed New Mexico in the second round, 70–68. They beat Kentucky in the quarterfinals, 77–67, and lost to 2-seed Penn State in the semifinals, 67–59.
 Providence received a 5-seed in a different region. They lost their first round game to 4-seed Miami (FL), 78–66.
 Georgetown received a 6-seed in a third region. They lost their first round game to 3-seed Baylor, 74–72.

College Basketball Invitational

In the 16-team College Basketball Invitational, the lone Big East representative was St. John's. The team earned a 4-seed in the East region, and lost their opening round game to top-seeded Richmond 75–69.

Awards and honors
The following players were honored with postseason awards after having been voted for by Big East Conference coaches.

Co-Players of the Year:
 Hasheem Thabeet, Connecticut, C, Jr.
 DeJuan Blair, Pittsburgh, C, So.
Defensive Player of the Year: 
 Hasheem Thabeet, Connecticut, C, Jr.
Rookie of the Year:
 Greg Monroe, Georgetown, C, Fr.
Most Improved Player:
 Dante Cunningham, Villanova, F, Sr.
Sixth Man Award:
 Corey Fisher, Villanova, G, So.
Sportsmanship Award:
 Alex Ruoff, West Virginia, G, Sr.
Scholar-Athlete of the Year:
 Alex Ruoff, West Virginia, G, Sr.
Coach of the Year:
 Jay Wright, Villanova (8th season)

All-Big East First Team:
 Hasheem Thabeet, Connecticut, C, Jr., 7–3, 263, Dar es Salaam, Tanzania
 Terrence Williams, Louisville, F, Sr., 6–6, 210, Seattle, Wash.
 Jerel McNeal, Marquette, G, Sr., 6–3, 200 Chicago, Ill.
 Luke Harangody, Notre Dame, F, Jr., 6–8, 251, Schererville, Ind.
 DeJuan Blair, Pittsburgh, C, So., 6–7, 265, Pittsburgh, Pa.
 Sam Young, Pittsburgh, F, Sr., 6–6, 215, Clinton, Md.

All-Big East Second Team:
 A.J. Price, Connecticut, G, Sr., 6–2, 181, Amityville, N.Y.
 Wesley Matthews, Marquette, G, Sr., 6–5, 215, Madison, Wis.
 Jonny Flynn, Syracuse, G, So., 6–0, 185, Niagara Falls, N.Y.
 Dante Cunningham, Villanova, F, Sr., 6–8, 230, Silver Spring, Md.
 Da’Sean Butler, West Virginia, F, Jr., 6–7, 225, Newark, N.J.

All-Big East Third Team:
 Deonta Vaughn, Cincinnati, G, Jr., 6–1, 195, Indianapolis, Ind.
 Jeff Adrien, Connecticut, F, Sr., 6–7, 243, Brookline, Mass.
 Earl Clark, Louisville, G/F, Jr., 6–8, 220, Rahway, N.J.
 Levance Fields, Pittsburgh, G, Sr., 5–10, 190, Brooklyn, N.Y.
 Jeremy Hazell, Seton Hall, G, So., 6–5, 185, Bronx, N.Y.

Big East Honorable Mention:
 Weyinmi Efejuku, Providence, G, Sr., 6–5, 210, Fresh Meadows, N.Y.
 Dominique Jones, USF, G, So., 6–4, 205, Lake Wales, Fla.
 Scottie Reynolds, Villanova, G, Jr., 6–2, 195, Herndon, Va.
 Alex Ruoff, West Virginia, G, Sr., 6–6, 220, Spring Hill, Fla.

Big East All-Rookie Team:
 Yancy Gates, Cincinnati, F, Fr., 6–9, 255, Cincinnati, Ohio
 Kemba Walker, Connecticut, G, Fr., 6–0, 175, Bronx, N.Y.
 Greg Monroe, Georgetown, C, Fr., 6–10, 240, Gretna, La.
 Samardo Samuels, Louisville, F, Fr., 6–8, 240, Trelawny Parish, Jamaica
 Mike Rosario, Rutgers, G, Fr., 6–3, 180, Jersey City, N.J.
 Devin Ebanks, West Virginia, F, Fr., 6–9, 205, Long Island City, N.Y.

The following players were selected to the 2009 Associated Press All-America teams.

First Team All-America:
 DeJuan Blair, Pittsburgh, Key Stats: 15.6 ppg, 12.2 rpg, 59.9 FG%, 1.5 steals (49 1st place votes, 294 points)
Second Team All-America:
 Hasheem Thabeet, Connecticut, Key Stats: 13.7 ppg, 10.9 rpg, 4.6 blocks, 64.3 FG% (19, 238)
 Luke Harangody, Notre Dame, Key Stats: 23.2 ppg, 12.0 rpg, 2.1 apg (6, 135)
 Jerel McNeal, Marquette, Key Stats: 19.3 ppg, 4.5 rpg, 3.8 apg, 40.6 3-pt FG% (7, 114)
Third Team All-America:
 Terrence Williams, Louisville, Key Stats: 12.3 ppg, 8.5 rpg, 5.1 apg, 2.5 steals (4, 103)
 Sam Young, Pittsburgh, Key Stats: 18.7 ppg, 6.1 rpg (1, 79)

See also
 2008–09 NCAA Division I men's basketball season
 2008–09 Connecticut Huskies men's basketball team
 2008–09 Georgetown Hoyas men's basketball team
 2008–09 Louisville Cardinals men's basketball team
 2008–09 Marquette Golden Eagles men's basketball team
 2008–09 Notre Dame Fighting Irish men's basketball team
 2008–09 Pittsburgh Panthers men's basketball team
 2008–09 Providence Friars men's basketball team
 2008–09 Syracuse Orange men's basketball team
 2008–09 Villanova Wildcats men's basketball team
 2008–09 West Virginia Mountaineers men's basketball team

References